The Jack London District, also called the Loft District, is a neighborhood of Oakland, California, USA, that occupies the region south of the Nimitz Freeway (Interstate 880) along the Embarcadero Freeway, between Adeline and Lake Merritt Channel. It includes and surrounds the Jack London Square shopping and tourist area, as well as the Warehouse District north of the Oakland Amtrak Station.  The area has a long history of industrial and warehouse land use. Since the late 1990s, the area has seen residential redevelopment.

History
The district developed early in Oakland's history as a warehouse and industrial district due to its proximity to major transportation: Broadway, Oakland's main street; the Transcontinental Railroad main line along Seventh Street (leading to the immense Oakland Long Wharf); two passenger depots of the Central Pacific Railroad (later, Southern Pacific), located at Seventh and Broadway and First and Broadway; the Key System streetcar line along Broadway; the Oakland Estuary (early referred to as the "Creek"); a bridge, later replaced by underwater tubes to adjacent Alameda; and lastly, a public highway using city streets, connecting to points east and south, replaced in the 1950s by Nimitz Freeway, (Interstate 880).

Nearby rail and Oakland's geographic centrality led to early industrial and warehouse development, which quickly spread northwest and southeast, largely along the rail corridors.  Rail lines once ran directly alongside warehouse buildings along second, third, and fourth streets, so that freight could be loaded directly from box cars to and from the warehouses. Track is still visible in some areas along the public right of way, many of which lack sidewalks and are currently used to park and store private cars.

Today

The Jack London District encompasses more than 70 blocks and a significant stretch of the Oakland waterfront which had been a prime development project for Oakland's mayor, Jerry Brown. Prior to 2000, housing mainly consisted of the Portbello condominiums (dating from the mid-1970s) and several reused warehouse buildings including the Fourth Street Lofts, the Tower Lofts, the Brick House Lofts, the Pocket Lofts, the Portico Lofts and the Phoenix Lofts. Since 2000, over one thousand new units of housing have been built in the area including The Sierra, the New Market Lofts, the Allegro Condominiums, The Landings, The Ellington, 288 Third, 428 Alice, AquaVia, The Bond and 200 Second Street. A neighborhood association in the district, The Jack London Improvement District advocates for the interests of the residents and commercial users of the District.

The district includes Jack London Square, one of Oakland's largest tourist attractions, which is an area of retail and office buildings that reside on the former heart of Oakland's port operations.  With the advent of containerized shipping the Port of Oakland and most of its operations has moved up the Estuary helping Jack London Square open up to the retail shops and restaurants it now houses, including Yoshi's jazz club.

In 2015, many formerly closed stores were being reutilized as restaurants and entertainment centers. The Barnes & Noble building, the anchor tenant that had closed in 2010, reopened as the Plank entertainment center/restaurant.

See also
Downtown Oakland, Oakland, California

References

Neighborhoods in Oakland, California
Warehouse districts of the United States
Jack London
Economy of Oakland, California